Ze with descender (Ҙ ҙ; italics: Ҙ ҙ), or Dhe is a letter of the Cyrillic script. It is used in both the Bashkir and Wakhi languages, where it represents the voiced dental fricative  and the voiced alveolar sibilant affricate  respectively. Its form is derived from the Cyrillic letter Ze (З з З з). It is romanized as Z with acute ⟨ź⟩ for Bashkir, and corresponds with Ezh ⟨ʒ⟩ in the Latin script of the Wakhi language.

The letter itself was introduced in 1939.

Computing codes

See also
З з : Cyrillic letter Ze
Ð ð : Latin letter Eth
Cyrillic characters in Unicode

References